Vishvamitra is one of the most venerated rishis or sages of ancient India. According to Hindu tradition, he is stated to have written most of the Mandala 3 of the Rigveda, including the Gayatri Mantra. The Puranas mention that only 24 rishis since antiquity have understood the whole meaning of —and thus wielded the whole power of — the Gayatri Mantra. Vishvamitra is supposed to have been the first, and Yajnavalkya the last. 

Before renouncing his kingdom and royal status, Brahmarishi Vishvamitra was a king, and thus he retained the title of Rajarshi, or 'royal sage'.

Textual background

Historically, Viśvāmitra Gāthina was a Rigvedic rishi who was the chief author of Mandala 3 of the Rigveda. Viśvāmitra was taught by Jamadagni Bhārgava. He was the purohita of the Bharata tribal king Sudās, until he was replaced by Vasiṣṭha. He aided the Bharatas in crossing the Vipāśa and Śutudrī rivers (modern Beas and Sutlej). In later Hindu texts, Viśvāmitra and Vasiṣṭha have a long-standing feud, and scholars have stated they historically had a feud regarding the position of the Bharata purohita. However, this view has been criticized due to lack of internal evidence and the projection of later views onto the Rigveda. In post-Rigvedic literature Viśvāmitra becomes a mythical sage.

Most of the stories related to Vishvamitra's life is narrated in the Valmiki Ramayana. Vishvamitra was a king in ancient India, also called Kaushika (descendant of Kusha) and belonged to Amavasu Dynasty. Vishwamitra was originally the King of Kanyakubja (modern day Kannauj). He was a valiant warrior and the great-grandson of a great king named Kusha. Valmiki Ramayana, prose 51 of Bala Kanda, starts with the story of Vishvamitra:

His story also appears in various Puranas; however, with variations from Ramayana. Vishnu Purana and Harivamsha chapter 27 (dynasty of Amaavasu) of Mahabharata narrates the birth of Vishvamitra. According to Vishnu Purana, Kushanabha married a damsel of Purukutsa dynasty (later called as Shatamarshana lineage - descendants of the Ikshvaku king Trasadasyu) and had a son by name Gaadhi, who had a daughter named Satyavati (not to be confused with the Satyavati of Mahabharata).

Life and legends

Birth 
Satyavati was married to an old man known as Richika who was foremost among the race of Bhrigu. Ruchika desired a son having the qualities of a Brahmin and so he gave Satyavati a sacrificial offering (charu) which he had prepared to achieve this objective. He also gave Satyavati's mother another charu to make her conceive a son with the character of a Kshatriya at her request. But Satyavati's mother privately asked Satyavati to exchange her charu with her. This resulted in Satyavati's mother giving birth to Vishvamitra, and Satyavati gave birth to Jamadagni, father of Parashurama, a person with qualities of a warrior.

Conflicts with Vashista

Maharshi Vasistha possessed a divine-cow Kamadhenu that was able to give everything that one wished for. Once king Kaushika (Vishwamitra) saw the cow and wished to possess her. He asked Vasistha to hand her over but Vasistha refused to do so saying she actually belongs to Devas and not him. King Kaushika became angry due to his arrogance and attacked Vasistha with all his forces. However, he was defeated by the power of Vasistha's penance and suraabhi/Kamadhenu's created soldiers and was somehow rescued by Vamdeva. He asked Vamdeva how Vasistha could defeat him all alone. Vamdeva told him this happened due to Vasistha's position as "Brahmarishi" due to his tapasya (penance). Kaushika then wanted to gain "Brahmarishi" like Vasistha. Doing penance guided by Vamdeva, King Kaushika eventually became Vishwamitra.

In one encounter, Vishwamitra cursed the king Harishchandra to become a pauper. Vashista accompanied him by becoming a bird himself to help him. There were several such instances of violent encounter between the sages and at times, Brahma, god of creation, had to intervene.

Alternative version
Vashista destroys Vishvamitra's entire army by the simple use of his great mystic and spiritual powers, breathing the Om syllable. Vishvamitra then undertakes a tapasya for several years to please Shiva, who bestows upon him the knowledge of celestial weaponry. He proudly goes to Vaśiștha's ashram again and uses all kinds of powerful weapons to destroy Vashista and his hermitage. He succeeded in the killings of Vashista's thousand sons but not Vashista himself.

An enraged Vashista brings out his brahmadanda, a wooden stick imbued with the power of Brahma. It consumes Vishvamitra's most powerful weapon, the brahmastra. Vashista then attempts to attack Vishvamitra, but his anger is allayed by Devas. Vishvamitra is left humiliated while Vashista restores his hermitage.

Seduction by Menaka

Menaka was born during the churning of the ocean by the devas and asuras and was one of the most beautiful apsaras (celestial nymph) in the world with quick intelligence and innate talent. However, Menaka desired a family. Due to his penance and the power he achieved through it, Vishwamitra frightened the gods and even tried to create another heaven. Indra, frightened by Vishvamitra's powers, sent Menaka from heaven to earth to lure him and break his meditation. Menaka successfully incited Vishwamitra's lust and passion. She succeeded in breaking the meditation of Vishwamitra. However, she fell in genuine love with him and a girl was born to them who later grew in Sage Kanva's ashram and came to be called Shakuntala. Later, Shakuntala falls in love with King Dushyanta and gives birth to a child called Bharata.

Kanva describes this tale in the Mahabharata:

However, later, Vishvamitra merely cursed Menaka to be separated from him forever, for he loved her as well and knew that she had lost all devious intentions towards him long ago.

After succumbing to Menakā’s flirtations, and after having a daughter with her, Vishvamitra then travels south to the Godāvarī to resume his austerities, settling down at a spot next where Śiva stood as Kālañjara.

Vishvamitra was also tested by the Apsara Rambha. She, however, was also cursed by Vishwamitra.

Rise to Brahmarishi
After cursing Rambha, Vishwamitra goes to the highest mountain of Himalayas to perform an even more severe tapasya for over 1000 years. He ceases to eat and reduces his breathing to a bare minimum.

He is tested again by Indra, who comes as a poor Brahmin begging for food just as Kaushika is ready to break a fast of many years by eating some rice. Kaushika instantly gives his food away to Indra and resumes his meditation. Kaushika also finally masters his passions, refusing to be provoked by any of Indra's testing and seductive interferences.

At the penultimate culmination of a multi-thousand-year journey, Kaushika's yogic power is at a peak. At this point, Brahma, as the head of Devas led by Indra, names Kaushika a Brahmarishi and names him Vishvamitra or Friend of All for his unlimited compassion. He then goes to meet Vashishta. It was customary that, if a sage was greeted by an equal or superior person, the sage would also greet the person. If the sage was greeted by an inferior person, the sage would simply bless them. Initially, when Vishwamitra greeted Vashishta with the pride of being a new Brahmarishi in heart, Vashishta simply blessed him. Suddenly all pride and desire left Vishwamitra's heart and he became a clean and clear Brahmarishi. When Vishwamitra turned back to leave, Vashishta realised a change of heart and proceeded to greet Vishwamitra. Vishwamitra is also embraced by Vashista and their enmity is instantly ended.

Trisanku

Another story Vishvamitra is known for is his creation of his own version of Svarga or heaven, called Trisanku Svarga.

When a proud King Trisanku asked his Guru Vashista to send him to heaven in his own body, guru responded that the body cannot ascend to heaven. King Trisanku then asked Vashista's hundred sons to send him to heaven. The sons, believing that Trisanku should not come to them after their father had refused, took outrage and cursed Trisanku to be a Chandala. Trisanku was transformed into a person with body smeared of ash, clothed in black and wearing iron jewelry. Unrecognizable to his subjects, he was driven out of the kingdom.

In his exile, Trisanku came across the sage Vishvamitra, who agreed to help him. Vishvamitra organized a great sacrifice and ritual propitiating the Devas, pleading that they accept Trisanku into heaven. Not one Deva responded. Angered, Vishvamitra used his yogic powers and ordered Trisanku to rise to heaven. Miraculously, Trisanku rose into the sky until he reached heaven, where he was pushed back down by Indra.

Enraged even more by this, Vishvamitra commenced the creation of another universe (including another Brahma) for Trisanku. He had only completed the Universe when Brihaspati ordered him to stop. Trisanku, however, did not fully transcend through Trisanku Svarga created for him. He remained fixed and upside-down in the sky and was transformed into a constellation, which is now known as Crux.
 
In the process of forming a new universe, Vishvamitra used up all the tapas he had gained from his austerities. Therefore, after the Trisanku episode, Vishvamitra had to start his prayers again to attain the status of a Brahmarshi and become an equal of Vashista.

Harishchandra/Ambarisha's sacrifice
While undertaking a penance, Kaushika helps a boy named Shunashepa who has been sold by his parents to be sacrificed at Harishchandra/Ambarisha's yagna to please Varuna. The king's son Rohit does not want to be the one sacrificed, as was originally promised to Varuna, so young Sunashepa is taken. A devastated and terrified Sunashepa falls at the feet of Kaushika, who is deep in meditation and begs for his help.

Kaushika teaches secret mantras to Sunashepa. The boy sings these mantras at the ceremony, is blessed by Mitra and Varuna and Ambarisha's ceremony is completed.

In another version of the story, Sunahshepa is lost son of Vishvamitra. When Vishvamitra was Prince of Bharats (Kaushik) - and his name was Vishwarath then, he was abducted by the enemy king Shambar. There, Shambar's daughter, Ugra, falls in love with Vishvarath. Ugra convinces Prince Vishvarath to marry her. Looking at the good character of Vishvarath, Shambar also agrees for the marriage. Soon after the marriage, the Bharatas win the battle against Shambar. When they found their Prince Vishvarath alive, they feel happy but they could not accept Ugra as their future queen as she is an Asura. To convert Ugra into an Sura, Vishvarath creates Gayatri Mantra, but people still refuse to accept her. Soon she gives birth to a son, but to save the son from the angry people, the greatest female sage Lopamudra sends the child to a hidden place. To Lopamudra and Vishvarath's sadness, people kill Ugra. But the son is saved, without the knowledge of Vishvarath. This child grows young and he comes to sacrifice himself in the ceremony of Ambarisha (or King Harishchandra).

Teacher of Rama

In the Hindu epic Ramayana, Vishvamitra is the preceptor of Rama and his brother Lakshmana. Rama is prince of Ayodhya, and believed to be the seventh Avatar of god Vishnu .

Vishvamitra gives them the knowledge of the Devastras or celestial weaponry [bala and ati bala], trains them in advanced religion and guides them to kill powerful demons like Tadaka, Maricha and Subahu. He also leads them to the Swayamvara ceremony for princess Sita, who becomes wife of Rama.

Works

Vishvamitra is said to have written the Gayatri Mantra. It is a verse from a sukta of Rigveda (Mandala 3.62.10). Gāyatrī is the name of the Vedic meter in which the verse is composed.

Gayatri mantra is repeated and cited very widely in Vedic literature and praised in several well-known classical Hindu texts such as Manusmriti ("there is nothing greater than the Savitri (Gayatri) Mantra.", Manu II, 83), Harivamsa and Bhagavad Gita. The mantra is an important part of the upanayana ceremony for young males in Hinduism and has long been recited by dvija men as part of their daily rituals. Modern Hindu reform movements spread the practice of the mantra to include women and all castes and its recitation is now widespread.

Descendants
Vishwamitra had many children from different women. Madhuchhanda was also a composer of many hymns in the Rigveda.
According to the Mahabharata, Sushruta, the father of plastic surgery, was one of his sons. Ashtaka, who was born from Madhavi, was successor to his kingdom. Shakuntala was born from the damsel Menaka. She was the mother of Bharata, who became a powerful emperor as well as an ancestor of Kuru kings.

Vishwamitra is one of the eight main gotras of Brahmins. All Brahmins belonging to Kaushika or Vishwamitra gotra are believed to have descended from Sage Vishwamitra. The distinction can be found from the respective pravaras,	
Vishwamitra, Aghamarshana, Kaushika	
Vishwamitra, Devarata, Owdala
Vishwamitra, Ashtaka
Vishwamitra, Maadhucchandasa, Dhananjaya

Kaushika is one of the pravara gotras of Vishwamitra gotra among Brahmins.

In film and television
 Vishwamitra is shown in the 1985 Tamil movie Raja Rishi with Sivaji Ganesan playing the role of the Sage. 
 Vishwamitra's role is played by Shrikant Soni in the TV series Ramayan, 1987 and Uttar Ramayan, 1988 on Doordarshan.
 Vishvamitra is shown in 1991 Telugu movie Brahmarshi Vishwamitra with N. T. Rama Rao playing the role of Sage.
 The TV show Vishwamitra (1989) is made on the story of Brahmarishi Vishwamitra. The role of Vishwamitra is played by Mukesh Khanna.
 Vishwamitra's role is played by Ashok Banthia in the TV series Ramayan, 2008 on Imagine TV. 
 Vishwamitra is shown in the show Siya Ke Ram airing on Star Plus, starring Manish Wadhwa.
The TV show Piya Albela is also based on the classic love story of Menaka and Vishwamitra, depicted as a modern-day love story revolving around Naren and Pooja.
Vishwamitra also appears in Shani (TV series)

See also

 Hinduism
 Hindu mythology

References

.

Brahmin gotras
Rishis
Sages in the Ramayana
Saptarishi